Gustavo Ermel (born 29 March 1995) is a Brazilian professional footballer who plays as a forward for Remo.

Career
Ermel began his career with Juventude, appearing at various youth levels before being promoted into the first-team. He made his debut for the club in the 2013 Campeonato Gaúcho versus Cerâmica. He scored on his Série D debut in a 4–0 win against Tupi on 12 October 2013. Juventude finished 2nd in Série D and therefore won promotion to Série C. He appeared in fourteen games in his second season with Juventude but failed to score. Ermel agreed to join Figueirense on loan in 2014 which saw him feature for their U20s. In the following year, Ermel was sent on loan to Lajeadense for the 2015 Campeonato Gaúcho campaign.

He returned to Juventude at the conclusion of the Campeonato Gaúcho after making just two appearances. In 2015, Ermel completed a permanent move to former loan club Figueirense. For the rest of 2015 he appeared for the Figueirense U20s, as he did in 2014 whilst on loan, before making the step up to the club's first-team in 2016. 2016 saw Ermel make his senior debut for Figueirense in the Primeira Liga, before making his Série A debut on 15 May against Ponte Preta. His first league goal came on 25 May in a home draw versus Santos. On 29 June 2017, Ermel joined Primeira Liga side Feirense on loan.

After only three appearances, he returned to Figueirense on 2 February 2018. Four months later, Deportivo Capiatá of the Paraguayan Primera División completed the loan signing of Ermel. In January 2019, Ermel departed Figueirense permanently to join Atlético Tubarão. On 7 June 2019, he was loaned out to Atlético Acreano.

Career statistics
.

References

External links

1995 births
Living people
People from Novo Hamburgo
Brazilian footballers
Association football forwards
Brazilian expatriate footballers
Expatriate footballers in Portugal
Expatriate footballers in Paraguay
Brazilian expatriate sportspeople in Portugal
Brazilian expatriate sportspeople in Paraguay
Campeonato Brasileiro Série A players
Campeonato Brasileiro Série C players
Campeonato Brasileiro Série D players
Primeira Liga players
Esporte Clube Juventude players
Figueirense FC players
Clube Esportivo Lajeadense players
C.D. Feirense players
Deportivo Capiatá players
Clube Atlético Tubarão players
Clube do Remo players
Sportspeople from Rio Grande do Sul